Parker Lewis Can't Lose is an American teen sitcom that originally aired on Fox from September 1990 to June 1993. It was produced by Clyde Phillips Productions in association with Columbia Pictures Television. During the last season, the series rebranded to Parker Lewis. The series depicts the tribulations of the title character Parker Lewis (played by Corin Nemec), a Santo Domingo High School student, for whom nothing is impossible. It was strongly influenced by the feature film Ferris Bueller's Day Off.

Premise
The title character, Parker Lewis, often narrates episodes. Parker Lewis, Jerry Steiner, and Mikey Randall are mainly concerned with fitting in.

Their efforts are often thwarted by Parker's little sister, Shelly, and school principal Grace Musso. The show focuses on teenage life and has a living-cartoon-like quality, however it contains human actors and actresses. Many episodes contain subtle references to movies, politics, and celebrities. The surrealism was toned down in the series' final season, going as far as having Parker acknowledge this by breaking the 4th wall and 'canceling' one of the shows Transitions. The 3,100 students at Santo Domingo High School are called Flamingos, after their school mascot. The school motto is "E Pluribus Flamingus", mimicking USA's motto E Pluribus Unum.

Episodes

Characters

Main

Parker Lloyd Lewis (played by Corin Nemec) – Parker Lewis is very popular at school. A smart guy with a penchant for garish shirts and cutting classes, Parker usually has a plan up his sleeve, and in turn, it usually involves outsmarting someone else. Plans put into effect begin with the command: "Synchronize Swatches." Parker is famous for his catch phrase, "Not a problem," which he often says when faced with trouble. He and his two "buds" have their high-tech headquarters hidden above the gym. In the final season, Parker finally settles down with one girl, Annie, and appears more mature and less reliant on his "Not a problem" attitude.
Michael Patrick "Mikey" Randall (played by Billy Jayne) – A rock and roll rebel without a cause and by far the most emotionally driven of the trio, he often quotes or paraphrases famous songs (for example, "To quote Don Henley, this is 'The End of the Innocence'" (episode two), or suggesting to "Paint It, Black" when Jerry betrays the group's trust). Mikey at one point considered dropping out of Santo Domingo HS when a prank by Shelly caused him to unknowingly play a love song, which he had composed for a girl he had feelings for, for the entire school.
Jerry Steiner (played by Troy Slaten) – A stereotypical nerd. In the first two seasons, he wears a trench coat (said to be made by NASA) from which he produces a wide variety of objects, which are apparently held inside the coat with Velcro. He addresses everyone formally by last name, e.g., "Mr. Lewis", "Mr. Randall", and even "Mr. Kubiac", or collectively as "sirs". At the end of the credits of the pilot episode, Jerry hid in the locker next to Parker's, talking endlessly to Parker through the door, not knowing that he had left, causing him to plaintively call out: "Mr. Lewis? Mr. Randall? Mr. Phillips? (Clyde Phillips, the series' creator and executive producer) Hello?" One notable episode dealt with Parker and Mikey confiscating Jerry's trench coat in help him get to meet a potential girlfriend.
She wants to get Parker expelled. She often breaks the glass on her office door when she makes her distinctive "thumb swoosh" gesture. She has a racy side which is sometimes exposed; her turn-ons include beards and large hands. She was portrayed as a spinster at first, but seemed to have a skill in men, one time having dated an officer of each of the armed forces. She has many secrets which she would rather be kept quiet, such as living in a $600,000 house on a $38,000 a year salary (episode six), which Parker uses as the necessity arises. However, Parker's blackmail ideas have sometimes backfired on him; one of his actions resulted in Musso's suspension. When a tougher principal is brought in to replace her, Parker cannot handle it going "from bad to worse", and works to get Musso reinstated.
Shelly Ann Lewis (played by Maia Brewton) – Parker's other nemesis, she is his little sister, who attends the same school as a freshman. She likes to manipulate teachers and parents to her benefit and tries to get Parker into trouble. Shelly also teams up with Musso if she sees a chance to ruin Parker. Most of the time, she is on friendly terms with Jerry and the two seem to end up in a constant relationship at the end of the series. Her favorite saying is: "My brother is a dead man!" whenever she finds an opportunity to bring Parker into an embarrassing situation. She has a tendency to call out "Mom!" when Parker gets one over on her, as seen at the start or end of various programs.
Martin Lloyd "Marty" Lewis (played by Timothy Stack) – Parker's father, he owns a video rental store called Mondo Video with his wife, and is helped by Parker and Shelly on weekends. He tries hard to keep some of the coolness that he had in his own school days when he was a self-described "young hoodlum". It is shown that he graduated from Santo Domingo High School and had two friends who were similar to Jerry and Mikey. Martin also had played mean pranks on Grace Musso, who had been a classmate of his at Santo Domingo, hence explaining Musso's resentment of Parker. The role of Mr. Lewis was played by Sherman Howard in the pilot episode.
Judy Lewis (played by Anne Bloom in season one and Mary Ellen Trainor in the pilot episode and seasons two and three) – Parker's mother, she can be loving and gentle, but if her family is threatened, she is ready for battle.
While walking, Kubiac causes earth tremors. His favorite line is, "Eat now?" In the series' beginning, he was initially introduced as a pure bully, aggressive and hostile towards other characters, but within a few episodes, his character was quickly changed into a more benign and friendly one – a "gentle giant", and he quickly became a helpful character who would often help Parker and his friends in their schemes. Later, it becomes revealed in a moment of confidence with Parker that Larry is more intelligent than he appears, and his dim-witted persona is merely an act.
Franklin "Frank" Lemmer (played by Taj Johnson) – Principal Musso's ultra-conservative sidekick and "lapdog" with vampiric tendencies, he has been in school 16 years (episode nine), wears black, and seems to have a telepathic connection to the principal and is obsessed with war, strategy, and politics. Musso can summon him with a dog whistle. He is able to teleport at will. Despite him largely being an adversary to Parker, at one time Parker actually agreed to help Frank Lemmer win over a girl named Denise (Andrea Elson), who turns out to be a blood relative of Grace Musso's. He was absent without explanation in the show's final season.
Annie Faith Sloan (played by Jennifer Guthrie) – She is Parker's love interest from the middle of the second season to the show's end. When Parker's parents were out of town one weekend, he invited Annie to his house with the intent to go all the way, only for Kubiac, Mikey, Jerry and others to show up to his house unannounced all at once and ruining his plans, but ultimately grateful when he learns Annie values abstinence.

Recurring
Dr. Norman Pankow (played by Gerrit Graham in seasons one and two) – The principal of rival El Corrado High School with a doctorate in penology, he is Musso's primary adult rival and a devotee of the sculpting of bonsai trees. As tough as Musso is, Pankow is regarded as much worse. One of Parker's stunts had caused Musso's suspension; when Dr. Pankow replaced her Parker admits he got more than he bargained for and needed to bring about Musso's reinstatement.
Nick Comstock (played by Paul Johansson) – Manager of the Atlas Diner during the second season, he is very attractive and possesses a supernatural ability to help people with their problems, often dishing out sage advice to Parker.
Bradley 'Brad' Penny (played by Harold Pruett) – He appeared in the show's final season. He works as a bricklayer, and is athletic and good-looking. Parker sees him as a nemesis, but Brad often only wants to be friends, though misunderstandings come between them. Shelly is intrigued by him.
Coach Hank Kohler (played by John Pinette). Joining during the show's final season, Hank Kohler served as a father figure for Larry Kubiac and the new owner of the Atlas Diner, which he eventually loses in the show's final episode, "The Last Supper". He is obsessed with Grace Musso, who is completely repulsed by him.

Production 
When the show was originally developed, it was meant to be for CBS, but it was rejected, and sent in to the new Fox network.

Broadcast and syndication
The show premiered in syndication on September 14, 1993, on the USA Network. As of February 2009, minisodes are available on Crackle. In late 2015 the show is airing in syndication on the Family Network on Saturday mornings.

Home media
On June 30, 2009, Shout! Factory released the complete first season of Parker Lewis Can't Lose on DVD in Region 1. The 4-DVD set includes special features including exclusive interviews with the cast, crew, and creators. Although the cast and crew discuss both Melanie Chartoff and her character, Grace Musso, Chartoff herself does not appear in any of the supplementary materials. Shout! Factory released Season 2 on January 26, 2010.
All 3 seasons have been released on SD Blu-Ray (in DVD quality) in Germany in 2015.

Awards and nominations

Internet support

Parker Lewis was one of the first shows with fan support on the Internet. It was done through an email list called The Flamingo Digest. Several people from the list were invited to the set.

Legacy
Fall Out Boy released a song called "Parker Lewis Can't Lose (But I'm Going To Give It My Best Shot)" on their album Fall Out Boy's Evening Out with Your Girlfriend.

On SWV's 1992 debut album It's About Time, there is a song called "Blak Puddin which includes the line "Parker Lewis can't Lose in Santa Domingo."

Hip-hop group Naughty By Nature refers to the Parker Lewis character in their 1992 hit "Hip Hop Hooray".

Childish Gambino refers to the show on his well-known Poundcake Freestyle, performed in October 2013 on Sway in the Morning hosted by Sway Calloway in the Morning with the line "I'm makin moves, couldn't lose, doin Parker Lewis"

The 1992 House of Pain song, "Feel It" includes the line "I can't lose like Parker Lewis, I'm undefeated."

The Royce da 5'9 song "Caterpillar" contains the lyrics "I'm a product of Parker Lewis and Kubiac."

In the Family Guy episode "Family Goy", a cutaway has Peter going through a "Parker Lewis" phase, sporting Parker's haircut and shirt. At dinner time, Peter tells Lois that it reminds him of "the Parker Lewis episode where Parker Lewis eats dinner!", to which Lois tells Peter, "no one cares about your canceled show." Peter then rants to Chris about how Parker Lewis can't lose.

Similar shows
 Lucy Lewis Can't Lose
 Saved by the Bell

References

External links

 
 
 Parker Lewis Theme – TelevisionTunes.com

1990s American high school television series
1990s American teen sitcoms
1990s American single-camera sitcoms
1990s American surreal comedy television series
1990 American television series debuts
1993 American television series endings
English-language television shows
Fox Broadcasting Company original programming
Television series about families
Television series about teenagers
Television series by Sony Pictures Television
Television shows set in Los Angeles